Caldwell Brook is a stream in the U.S. state of Minnesota.

Caldwell Brook was named for an early settler.

See also
List of rivers of Minnesota
List of longest streams of Minnesota

References

Rivers of Itasca County, Minnesota
Rivers of Koochiching County, Minnesota
Rivers of Minnesota